The 1896 Barcelona Corpus Christi procession bombing was an attack carried out on the Feast of Corpus Christi procession in Barcelona on June 7, 1896. The identity of the perpetrators is disputed: the attack was attributed to anarchists but this was a result of forced confessions through torture.

Background
Anarchism in Spain had been increasingly popular among workers' groups since the 1870s. The continual failure of general strikes as a tool for galvanizing change to working conditions combined with the violent repression of the state against the strikes (such as the Rio Tinto massacre) disappointed many, and the advocacy for use of violence began to take hold. Both assailants were soon executed and in 1894 the government began an outright suppression of anarchism.

Bombing
A small group of anarchists originally planned to bomb the Corpus Christi procession on June 6, 1896, at Barcelona Cathedral.  The group, led by Nogues Molas, abandoned the plot at the last minute, but another group convened the next day for the next stage of the procession.  A single bomb was dropped from a building above on the procession as it passed through Carrer dels Canvis Nous street at 9 a.m. on June 7, 1896.  Three congregants were killed instantly and many others were wounded.  Another nine would die from their injuries in the following days.

The identity of the perpetrator or perpetrators is disputed and remains controversial.  Anarchists at the time denied any role in the bombing as its intended target, poorer working-class churchgoers, did not align with typical propaganda of the deed actions that targeted the rich bourgeoisie.  Anti-clerical sentiments are found, however, in some late 19th century anarchist circles so the symbol of the Catholic Church could have been the intended target.

Trade unionist and militant anarchist  is the most commonly accepted perpetrator and was accused and tried for the attack, although he denied his role until a confession was obtained under torture in 1897.  Some anarchists claimed that a French agitator, François Girault, later confessed to the attack before fleeing to Argentina.

Aftermath
The infamous Montjuïc trials took place in 1897 where 87 alleged conspirators were accused and tried.  Many of the detainees were outspoken against the use of violence and condemned the attack.  Five defendants were sentenced to death and executed, including Ascheri, and another 67 were sentenced to imprisonment.  While the sentences removed many prominent anarchist leaders from further activities, allegations of forced confessions and torture of defendants further radicalized other anarchists throughout Spain.  In August 1897, Spanish Prime Minister Antonio Cánovas del Castillo was assassinated by anarchist Michele Angiolillo for his role in the Montjuïc trials.

Anarchist sentiment only hardened in Barcelona and 13 years after the Corpus Christi bombing, Barcelona workers staged a general strike in 1909 that was violently suppressed.  Later, during the Spanish Civil War, Barcelona was the epicenter of the brief Anarchist Catalonia state.

References

June 1896 events
Terrorist incidents in Spain
Anarchism in Spain
Terrorist incidents in the 19th century